"Blanco y Negro" (English: "Black and White") is a song by Mexican-American cumbia group A.B. Quintanilla y Los Kumbia All Starz. It was released on August 27, 2013 as the second single from his eighth studio album Blanco y Negro (2013).

Music video
The music video was directed by Mark Muñoz and produced by Muñoz's company Made Films. It was released in October 2013. The video shows A.B. Quintanilla and the Kumbia All Starz performing the song along with a model. The video is in black and white with a few color shots on specific parts.

Track listing
 Digital download
 "Blanco y Negro" – 3:34

Personnel
 Written by A.B. Quintanilla, Luigi Giraldo, and Descemer Bueno
 Produced by A.B. Quintanilla and Luigi Giraldo
 Lead vocals by Jesús "Isbo" Isbóseth and Ramón Vargas
 Background vocals by A.B. Quintanilla

References

2013 songs
2013 singles
Kumbia All Starz songs
Songs written by A. B. Quintanilla
Song recordings produced by A. B. Quintanilla
Spanish-language songs
Universal Music Latino singles
Songs written by Descemer Bueno